Castilleja bella is a species in the Castilleja genus known by the common name Arteaga Indian paintbrush (Spanish: Pincel de Indio de Arteaga). It is native to northeastern Mexico, primarily the states of Nuevo León and Coahuila, where it grows in montane habitats.

Description

Castilleja bella is a perennial, herbaceous, and hemiparasitic angiosperm that grows in montane habitats above altitudes of 2,500 meters above sea level. It has erect stems that are typically under 10cm in height, and its inflorescences consists of bracts in shades of bright red.

Image gallery

References

External links
 Kew Plants of the World Online profile for Castilleja bella
 Castilleja bella Standl. photo gallery by Mark Egger

bella
Flora of Mexico
Taxa named by Paul Carpenter Standley